Ratthanakorn Maikami (born 7 January 1998) is a Thai professional footballer who plays as a defensive midfielder for Thai League 1 club Buriram United.

International career
In August 2017, he won the Football at the 2017 Southeast Asian Games with Thailand U23.

Honours

Club
Buriram United
 Thai League 1 (2): 2017, 2018
 Thai FA Cup (1): 2021–22
 Thai League Cup (2): 2016, 2021–22
 Thailand Champions Cup (1): 2019

International
Thailand U-23
 SEA Games Gold Medal (1): 2017

References

External links
 Ratthanakorn Maikami profile at Buriram United website
 

1998 births
Living people
Ratthanakorn Maikami
Ratthanakorn Maikami
Association football midfielders
Ratthanakorn Maikami
Ratthanakorn Maikami
Ratthanakorn Maikami
Ratthanakorn Maikami
Southeast Asian Games medalists in football
Footballers at the 2018 Asian Games
Competitors at the 2017 Southeast Asian Games
Ratthanakorn Maikami
Competitors at the 2019 Southeast Asian Games